Simpang-kanan River (means: Right Junction River) is the name of several Indonesian rivers:

 Simpang-kanan River (North Sumatra), 
 Simpang-kanan River, Riau, 
 Simpang-kanan River, Riau, 
 Simpang-kanan River (South Sumatra), 

Rivers of Sumatra
Rivers of Indonesia